Union Township, New Jersey is the name of:

Existing townships
Union Township, Hunterdon County, New Jersey
Union Township, Union County, New Jersey
Union (CDP), New Jersey, the township's downtown area

Defunct municipalities
Union Township, Bergen County, New Jersey, now Lyndhurst, New Jersey as of 1917
Union Township, Camden County, New Jersey, dissolved in 1868
Union Township, Hudson County, New Jersey, dissolved in 1898
Union Township, Ocean County, New Jersey, now Barnegat Township, New Jersey

See also
 Union Township (disambiguation)
Union Beach, New Jersey
Union City, New Jersey
Union County, New Jersey

New Jersey township disambiguation pages